The 2021 Cannons Lacrosse Club season was the Cannons Lacrosse Club's 21st season and their first Premier Lacrosse League season.

Schedule

Expansion
It was announced that the Cannons would join the PLL as part of the MLL–PLL merger on December 16, 2020. They held their expansion draft on March 13, 2021.

Rebrand
The Cannons moved from Veterans Memorial Stadium (Quincy, Massachusetts) to Medford when hosting their preseason training. They also rebranded from the "Boston Cannons" to Cannons Lacrosse Club.

Regular season
The Cannons played their first PLL game in Gillette Stadium on June 4, 2021 in a 12-13 loss to Redwoods Lacrosse Club. They finished the season 3-6, earning a playoff spot.

Playoffs
The Cannons were eliminated from the playoffs in a quarterfinals 13-9 loss to Atlas Lacrosse Club.

References

Premier Lacrosse League
2021 in lacrosse
Lacrosse in Boston